The 1839 New Hampshire gubernatorial election was held on March 12, 1839.

Incumbent Democratic Governor Isaac Hill did not stand for re-election.

Democratic nominee John Page defeated Whig nominee James Wilson II with 55.89% of the vote.

General election

Candidates
John Page, Democratic, former U.S. Senator
James Wilson II, Whig, former Speaker of the New Hampshire House of Representatives, Whig nominee for Governor in 1838

Results

Notes

References

1839
New Hampshire
Gubernatorial